Ossowski (feminine: Ossowska; plural: Ossowscy) or Osowski or Osovski or Osovskiy (feminine: Osowska or Osovskaya ; plural: Osowscy) is the surname of several aristocratic families of Poland. It may refer to:

People

Individuals 
 Alexander Ossovsky (1871–1957), Russian composer and musicologist
 Arkadiusz Ossowski (born 1996), Polish handball player
 Douglas Osowski (born 1969), American voice actor and writer
 Efim Osowski (1930-2004), Russian educator
 John Ossowski (born 1962), Canadian rower
 Leonie Ossowski, pen name of Jolanthe von Brandenstein (1925–2019), German writer
 Maria Ossowska (1896–1974), Polish sociologist
 Mark Osowski (1963–2004), American basketball coach
 Oleg Osowski (born 1961), Russian literary critic
 Stanisław Ossowski (1897–1963), Polish sociologist
 Ted Ossowski (1922–1965), American football player
 Władysław Ossowski (1925–2000), Polish resistance member
 Nathan Ossowski (born 1979), lawyer

Families

Ossowski 
 Ossowski family, Coat of arms of Abdank
 Ossowski family, Coat of arms of Abschatz
 Ossowski family, Coat of arms of Brochwicz
 Ossowski family, Coat of arms of Dołęga
 Ossowski family, Coat of arms of Gryf
 Ossowski family, Coat of arms of Prus I
 Ossowski family, Coat of arms of Rola
 Ossowski family, Coat of arms of Ulina

Osowski 
 Osowski family, Coat of arms of Dołęga
 Osowski family, Coat of arms of Rola
 Osowski family, Coat of arms of Ulina

See also
 
 
 
 Osofsky, a surname

References
Genealogia dynastyczna

Polish-language surnames
Ossowski